Julia Drusilla was the favorite sister of Roman emperor Caligula. Other uses are;
 "Julia Drusilla (daughter of Juba II)" (name disputed)
 Julia Drusilla (daughter of Ptolemy of Mauretania)
 Julia Drusilla (daughter of Herod Agrippa)
 Julia Drusilla (daughter of Caligula)

See also
 Livia Drusilla, took the name Julia upon her adoption
 Drusilla, given name